Scopula demissaria is a moth of the family Geometridae. It is endemic to South Africa.

References

Endemic moths of South Africa
Moths described in 1863
demissaria
Taxa named by Francis Walker (entomologist)
Moths of Africa